The 1968 United States presidential election in California took place on November 5, 1968, as part of the 1968 United States presidential election. State voters chose 40 representatives, or electors, to the Electoral College, who voted for president and vice president.

California narrowly voted for the Republican nominee, former Vice President Richard Nixon of New York, over the Democratic nominee, Vice President Hubert Humphrey of Minnesota. The American Independent Party candidate, former Alabama governor George Wallace, performed rather well in California despite being thousands of miles away from his base in the Deep South.

Although Nixon was born and raised in California, he had moved to New York, following his failed 1962 gubernatorial bid, and thus identified New York as his home state in this election. After he won the election, Nixon moved his residency back to California.

Nixon had previously defeated John F. Kennedy in the Golden State in 1960, and would later win the state again against George McGovern in 1972. Had Humphrey or Wallace come out victorious in California, Nixon would have earned only 261 electoral votes, and thus, the election would have been sent to the United States House of Representatives.

Nixon is the last Republican candidate to carry Santa Cruz County by a majority of the popular vote, although Republicans in 1972 and 1980 carried the county by plurality, whilst Humphrey is the last Democrat to carry Kings County. Nixon also became the first ever Republican to win the White House without carrying Alameda County, as well as the first to do so without carrying Santa Clara County since Ulysses Grant in 1868, and the first to do so without carrying San Mateo County since Abraham Lincoln in 1860.

Nixon's victory was the first of six consecutive Republican victories in the state, as California would not vote for a Democratic candidate again until Bill Clinton in 1992. Since then it has become a safe Democratic state.

, this is the last election where California did not have the highest number of electoral votes.

Results

Results by county

Notes

References

California
1968
1968 California elections